Numerous castles and palaces (schloss) are found in the German state of Saxony-Anhalt. These buildings, some of which have a history of over 1000 years, were the setting of historical events, domains of famous personalities and are still imposing buildings to this day.

This list encompasses castles described in German as Burg (castle or manor house), Festung (fort/fortress), Schloß (manor house, castle or palace) and Palais/Palast (palace). Many German Schlösser after the middle ages were mainly built as royal or ducal palaces rather than as a fortified building.

Dessau-Roßlau 
 Georgium Castle
 Gotihic House
 Grokühnau Castle
 Haideburg Hunting Lodge
 Johannbau
 Luisium Castle
 Mosigkau Castle
 Roßlau Castle

Halle (Saale) 
 Giebichenstein Castle
 Moritzburg
 Neue Residenz

Magdeburg 
 Magdeburg Fortress
 Fort I
 Fort Berge
 Turmschanze
 Magdeburg Citadel
 Zwischenwerk VIII a
 Randau Castle

Altmarkkreis Salzwedel 
 Apenburg Castle, Apenburg
 Beetzendorf Castle, Beetzendorf
 Gardelegen Castle, Gardelegen
 Weteritz Castle, Gardelegen
 Kalbe Castle, Kalbe (Milde)
 Kläden Castle, Kläden
 Klötze Castle, Klötze
 Kunrau Castle, Kunrau
 Letzlingen Hunting Lodge, Letzlingen
 Salzwedel Castle, Salzwedel
 Tylsen Castle, Tylsen

Anhalt-Bitterfeld 
 Altjeßnitz Castle, Altjeßnitz
 Castlekemmnitz Castle, Castlekemnitz
 Gröbzig Castle, Gröbzig
 Großpaschleben Castle, Großpaschleben
 Geuz Castle, Köthen (Anhalt)
 Schloss Köthen, Köthen (Anhalt)
 Lindau Castle, Lindau
 Bärenthoren Castle, Polenzko
 Pouch Castle, Pouch
 Reinsdorf Castle, Reinsdorf (Südliches Anhalt)
 Walternienburg Castle, Walternienburg
 Gölzau Castle, Weißandt-Gölzau
 Zerbst Palace, Zerbst / Anhalt
 Zerbst Castle, Zerbst / Anhalt
 Quetz Castle, Zörbig
 Zörbig Castle, Zörbig

Börde 

 Altenhausen Castle, Altenhausen
 Angern Water Castle, Angern
 Trautenburg Castle, Ausleben
 Bartensleben Castle, Bartensleben
 Veltheimsburg Castle, Bebertal
 Calvörde Castle, Calvörde
 Dreileben Castle, Dreileben
 Eggenstedt Castle, Eggenstedt
 Eichenbarleben Castle, Eichenbarleben
 Erxleben Castle, Erxleben
 Flechtingen water Castle, Flechtingen
 Hasselburg Hunting Lodge, Flechtingen
 Gröningen Castle, Gröningen
 Krottorf Castle, Gröningen
 Bergen Manor House, Groß Rodensleben
 Detzel Castle, Haldensleben
 Hundisburg Castle, Haldensleben
 Harbke Castle, Harbke
 Hötensleben Castle, Hötensleben
 Asseburgisches Castle, Hornhausen
 Ramstedt Castle, Loitsche
 Oebisfelde Castle, Oebisfelde
 Ampfurth Castle, Oschersleben (Bode)
 Groß Germersleben Castle, Oschersleben (Bode)
 Hadmersleben Castle, Oschersleben (Bode)
 Klein Oschersleben Castle, Oschersleben (Bode)
 Neindorf Castle, Oschersleben (Bode)
 Oschersleben Castle, Oschersleben (Bode)
 Peseckendorf Castle, Peseckendorf
 Heinrichshorst Hunting Lodge, Rogätz
 Klutturm Rogätz, Rogätz
 Klein Santersleben Castle, Schackensleben
 Seggerde Castle, Seggerde
 Sommerschenburg Castle, Sommersdorf
 Bahrendorf Castle, Sülzetal
 Bodendorf Castle, Süplingen
 Ummendorf Castle, Ummendorf
 Walbeck Castle, Walbeck
 Wanzleben Castle, Wanzleben
 Weferlingen Marsh Castle, Weferlingen
 Wolmirstedt Castle, Wolmirstedt

Burgenlandkreis 

 Rudelsburg, Bad Kösen
 Saaleck Castle, Bad Kösen
 Breitenbach Castle, Breitenbach
 Kempe Breitenbach, Breitenbach
 Bucha Castle, Bucha
 Burgscheidungen Castle, Burgscheidungen
 Castlewerben Castle, Castlewerben
 Droyßig Castle, Droyßig
 Eckartsburg, Eckartsberga
 Marienthal Castle, Eckartsberga
 Etzoldshain Castle, Elsteraue
 Zscheiplitz Castle, Freyburg
 Neuenburg Castle (Freyburg)
 Fronfeste Gleina, Gleina
 Gleina Castle, Gleina
 Goseck Castle, Goseck
 Haynsburg, Haynsburg
 Heuckewalde Water Castle, Heuckewalde
 Klosterhäseler Castle, Klosterhäseler
 Lützen Castle, Lützen
 Imperial Palace of Memleben, Memleben
 Wendelstein Castle, Memleben
 Naumburg Residenz, Naumburg (Saale)
 Nebra Castle, Nebra (Unstrut)
 Nebra Castle, Nebra (Unstrut)
 Osterfeld Castle, Osterfeld
 Reinsdorf Castle, Reinsdorf
 Schönburg Castle, Schönburg
 Steinburg Castle, Steinburg
 Bonau Castle, Teuchern
 Trebnitz Castle, Trebnitz
 Neu-Augustusburg Castle, Weißenfels
 Moritzburg Castle, Zeitz
 Zscheiplitz Castle, Zscheiplitz

Harz 

 Windenhütte Hunting Lodge, Altenbrak
 Hessen Castle, Hessen (Osterwieck)
 Zilly Castle, Aue-Fallstein
 Oberhof Ballenstedt, Ballenstedt
 Ballenstedt Castle, Ballenstedt
 Regenstein Castle, Blankenburg (Harz)
 Great Castle Blankenburg, Blankenburg (Harz)
 Little Castle Blankenburg, Blankenburg (Harz)
 Luisenburg, Blankenburg (Harz)
 Königsburg Ruins, Elbingerode (Harz)
 Ackeburg, Falkenstein / Harz
 Falkenstein Castle (Harz), Falkenstein / Harz
 Old Falkenstein Castle, Falkenstein / Harz
 Meisdorf Baroque Palace, Falkenstein / Harz
 Erichsberg Castle near Friedrichsbrunn
 Heinrichsburg near Gernrode
 Güntersburg, near Güntersberge, ruin
 Emersleben Castle, Halberstadt
 Spiegelsberge Hunting Lodge, Halberstadt
 Hasserode Castle, Hasserode, site
 Anhalt Castle, Harzgerode, ruins
 Harzgerode Castle, Harzgerode
 Heinrichsberg Castle, Harzgerode, ruins
 Hausneindorf Castle, Hausneindorf
 Heimburg Castle, Heimburg
 Domburg im Hakel, Heteborn
 Huysburg, Huy
 Röderhof Castle, Huy
 Schlanstedt Castle, Huy
 Westerburg Castle, Huy
 Ilsenburg House, Ilsenburg
 Langenstein Castle, Langenstein
 Gersdorf Castle, Quedlinburg
 Quedlinburg Castle, Quedlinburg
 Roseburg near Rieder
 Ahlsburg, Stapelburg
 Stapelburg Castle, Stapelburg
 Lauenburg, Stecklenberg
 Stecklenburg, Stecklenberg
 Stiege Hunting Lodge, Stiege
 Wendhausen Tower, Thale
 Minsleben Castle, Wernigerode
 Struvenburg, Wernigerode
 Wernigerode Castle, Wernigerode

Jerichower Land 
 Zerben Castle, Elbe-Parey
 Parchen Castle, Genthin
 Dretzel Castle, Gladau
 Dornburg Castle, Gommern
 Gommern Castle, Gommern
 Leitzkau Castle, Gommern
 Grabow Castle, Grabow
 Kade Little Castle, Kade
 Karow Castle, Karow
 Königsborn Castle, Königsborn
 Brandenstein Castle, Krüssau
 Loburg Castle, Loburg
 Lüttgenziatz Castle, Möckern
 Möckern Castle, Möckern
 Stegelitz Castle, Möckern
 Wendgräben Castle, Möckern
 Pietzpuhl Castle, Pietzpuhl
 Schlagenthin Castle, Schlagenthin
 Ringelsdorf Castle, Tucheim
 Tucheim Castle, Tucheim
 Waldrogäsen Castle, Wüstenjerichow
 Wüstenjerichow Castle, Wüstenjerichow
 Zabakuck Castle, Zabakuck

Mansfeld-Südharz 

 Allstedt Castle, Allstedt
 Beyernaumburg Castle, Beyernaumburg
 Bornstedt Castle, Bornstedt
 Schwiederschwende Hunting Lodge, Breitungen
 Hinterort Castle, Eisleben
 Mittelort Castle, Eisleben
 Vorderort Castle, Eisleben
 Friedeburg Castle, Friedeburg (Saale)
 Rammelburg Castle, Friesdorf
 Arnstein Castle, Harkerode
 Burgörner Castle, Hettstedt
 Hettstedt Castle, Hettstedt
 Mansfeld Castle, Mansfeld
 Trutz Mansfeld Castle, Mansfeld
 Neu-Asseburg Castle, Mansfeld
 Quenstedt Castle, Quenstedt
 Questenberg Castle, Questenberg
 Roßla Castle, Roßla
 Grasburg, Rottleberode
 Sandersleben Castle, Sandersleben (Anhalt)
 Oberröblingen Castle, Sangerhausen
 Grillenburg, Sangerhausen
 Alt-Morungen Castle, Sangerhausen
 Neu-Morungen Castle, Sangerhausen
 Old Castle, Sangerhausen, Sangerhausen
 New Castle, Sangerhausen, Sangerhausen
 Seeburg Castle, Seeburg
 Stolberg Castle, Stolberg (Harz)
 Tilleda Imperial Palace, Tilleda
 Wallhausen Castle, Wallhausen
 Oberwiederstedt Castle, Wiederstedt
 Wippra Castle, Wippra
 Wolfsberg Castle, Wolfsberg, Sangerhausen

Saalekreis 

 Bad Lauchstädt Castle, Bad Lauchstädt
 Beesenstedt Castle, Beesenstedt
 Bedra Castle, Braunsbedra
 Frankleben Castle, Braunsbedra
 Hohenturm Castle, Hohenthurm
 Dieskau Castle, Kabelsketal
 Krosigk Castle, Krosigk
 Landsberg Castle, Landsberg
 Merseburg Castle, Merseburg
 Zech’sches Palace, Merseburg
 Sankt Ulrich Castle, Mücheln (Geiseltal)
 Ostrau Castle, Ostrau
 Lodersleben Castle, Querfurt
 Querfurt Castle, Querfurt
 Vitzenburg Castle, Querfurt
 Zingst Castle, Querfurt
 Rothenburg Castle, Rothenburg
 Schafstädt Castle, Schafstädt
 Castleliebenau Castle, Schkopau
 Bündorf Castle, Schkopau
 Schkopau Castle, Schkopau
 Schochwitz Castle, Schochwitz
 Schraplau Castle, Schraplau
 Beuchlitz Castle, Teutschenthal
 Teutschenthal Castle, Teutschenthal
 Wettin Castle, Wettin
 Dölkau Castle, Zweimen

Salzlandkreis 

 Alsleben Castle, Alsleben (Saale)
 Warmsdorf Castle, Amesdorf
 Aschersleben Castle, Aschersleben
 Wilsleben Castle, Aschersleben
 Barby Castle, Barby (Elbe)
 Bernburg Castle, Bernburg (Saale)
 Biendorf Castle, Biendorf
 Egeln Castle, Egeln
 Konradsburg, Ermsleben
 Ermsleben Castle, Ermsleben
 Freckleben Castle, Freckleben
 Gatersleben Castle, Gatersleben
 Gröna Castle, Gröna
 Großmühlingen Renaissance Castle, Großmühlingen
 Klein Rosenburg Castle, Groß Rosenburg
 Gänsefurth Castle, Hecklingen
 Hecklingen Castle, Hecklingen
 Castle Schneidlingen, Hecklingen
 Hoym Princes‘ House, Hoym
 Hoym Castle, Hoym
 Piesdorf Castle, Könnern
 Poplitz Castle, Könnern
 Haus Zeitz, Könnern
 Neugattersleben Castle, Neugattersleben
 Nienburg Castle, Nienburg (Saale), burnt down in 1996
 Plötzkau Castle, Plötzkau
 Schadeleben Castle, Schönebeck (Elbe)
 Hohenerxleben Castle, Staßfurt
 Rathmannsdorf Castle, Staßfurt
 Unseburg Lowland Castle, Unseburg

Stendal 

 Badingen Castle, Badingen
 Calberwisch Castle, Düsedau
 Döbbelin Castle, Insel
 Hohenkamern Castle, Kamern
 Krevese Castle, Krevese
 Groß Schwarzlosen Castle, Lüderitz
 Möringen Castle, Möringen
 Krumke Castle, Osterburg (Altmark)
 Sandau Castle, Sandau (Elbe)
 Schönfeld Castle, Schönfeld
 Schönhausen Castle, Schönhausen (Elbe)
 Castle Mahlitz, Schollene
 Schollene Castle, Schollene
 Storkau Castle, Storkau (Elbe)
 Old Castle, Tangerhütte, Tangerhütte
 New Castle, Tangerhütte, Tangerhütte
 Tangermünde Castle, Tangermünde
 Vinzelberg Castle, Vinzelberg
 Vollenschier Castle, Wittenmoor
 Wust Castle, Wust

Wittenberg 

 Hunting Lodge Annaburg, Annaburg
 Reinharz Hunting Lodge, Bad Schmiedeberg
 Coswig Castle, Coswig (Anhalt)
 Hundeluft Castle, Hundeluft
 Jessen Castle, Jessen (Elster)
 Klöden Castle, Klöden
 Kropstädt Castle, Kropstädt
 Oranienbaum Castle, Oranienbaum
 Lichtenburg Castle, Prettin
 Castle Pretzsch, Pretzsch
 Radis Castle, Radis
 Trebitz Castle, Trebitz
 Wartenburg Castle, Wartenburg
 Nudersdorf Castle, Lutherstadt Wittenberg
 Castle Wittenberg, Lutherstadt Wittenberg
 Domäne Wörlitz, Wörlitz
 Wörlitz Castle, Wörlitz

Literature 
 Wilhelm van Kempen: Schlösser und Herrensitze in Provinz Sachsen und in Anhalt. Frankfurt/M.: Weidlich 1961. (Castleen, Schlösser, Herrensitze, Bd. 19)
 Corinna Köhlert, Jürgen Blume, Von Schlössern und Castleen in Sachsen-Anhalt. Halle (Saale) 2000,

See also
 List of castles
 List of castles in Germany